Sabit Osman Avcı (1921 – February 8, 2009) was a Turkish politician, who served as government minister and the Speaker of the Grand National Assembly.

References

1921 births
People from Artvin
Justice Party (Turkey) politicians
20th-century Turkish politicians
Government ministers of Turkey
Ministers of Energy and Natural Resources of Turkey
Speakers of the Parliament of Turkey
2009 deaths